Hurricane Easy was the fifth tropical storm, hurricane, and major hurricane of the 1950 Atlantic hurricane season. The hurricane developed in the western Caribbean Sea on September 1, and tracked northeastward. After crossing Cuba, the hurricane rapidly strengthened in the eastern Gulf of Mexico to reach peak winds of 120 mph (200 km/h). Easy executed a cyclonic loop, moved northeastward to hit near Cedar Key, Florida, executed a second loop, and hit western Florida again. After rapidly weakening over Florida, the hurricane turned to the northwest, and ultimately dissipated over northeastern Arkansas on September 9. From the point when Hurricane Easy entered the Gulf of Mexico until it weakened to a tropical storm, it was observed nearly constantly from radars or Reconnaissance Aircraft.

Easy is the most recent major hurricane to strike the Homosassa, Florida, area. Due to the hurricane remaining near the northwest Florida coast for an extended period of time, Easy produced severe rainfall and strong waves, resulting in heavy damage in the Cedar Key area. Hurricane Easy was one of two major hurricanes to strike Florida during the year; the other was Hurricane King which affected Miami.

Meteorological history 

Following the passage of Hurricane Baker through the Caribbean Sea, a trough of low pressure persisted across the western Caribbean Sea. On August 31, convection became more concentrated to the south of the Isle of Youth, and on September 1 the disturbance developed into a tropical storm; it was later given the name "Easy", as part of the United States Weather Bureau naming tropical cyclones with the Joint Army/Navy Phonetic Alphabet. A developing anticyclone and moist air over the region provided favorable conditions for intensification, as the storm tracked slowly northeastward. On September 2, Tropical Storm Easy attained hurricane status about 50 miles (85 km) south of the Isle of Youth.

The hurricane quickly crossed the island, passing just east of Havana before reaching the southeastern Gulf of Mexico on September 3. After entering the Gulf of Mexico, Easy turned to the north-northwest, paralleling the Florida coastline a short distance offshore while producing hurricane-force winds onshore. That day, a ridge of high pressure strengthened to the north of the storm, leaving weaker steering currents. This caused Hurricane Easy to execute a counter-clockwise loop to the west of Tampa, Florida.

Steering currents again became weak, causing Easy to execute a second loop in 24 hours towards the southeast. After briefly emerging into the Gulf of Mexico, the hurricane made its final landfall on Homosassa Springs to the north of Tampa, and rapidly weakened to a tropical storm over land. Easy turned to the northeast, which was followed by a turn to the northwest as the storm neared the Atlantic coast. On September 7, Easy crossed into Georgia, and shortly thereafter it weakened to a tropical depression. The depression continued northwestward for two days until dissipating over extreme northeastern Arkansas on September 9. The reason for its erratic track, including the two loops, is unknown, although it is potentially due to a Fujiwhara interaction with Hurricane Dog to its east.

Preparations and impact 

Despite its unusual track, the Weather Bureau issued hurricane warnings in a timely manner, though warnings were issued for a larger area than those that actually experienced hurricane-force winds. In the Florida Keys, winds from Easy reached , which downed trees and power lines, littering local streets with debris. Heavy seas moved around a Navy barge, though no damage was reported.

Hurricane Easy produced hurricane-force winds across large portions of western Florida, including over  winds in Cedar Key for 9 and 1/2 hours. The town, which reported a minimum pressure of 958.3 mbar (28.30 in), experienced the eye of the hurricane for 2 and 1/2 hours while strong waves hit the coast. The tide in Tampa Bay rose , the highest since 1921.

Hurricane Easy was described as the worst hurricane in the Cedar Key area in 70 years. The hurricane left half of the houses destroyed or unfit for rehabilitation, while 90% of the others were damaged. The strong winds destroyed the roofs of 150 homes and buildings. The rainfall caused severe flooding that resulted in crop damage. Easy was indirectly responsible for two deaths due to electrocutions. In addition, 27 people were injured from the hurricane. The strong waves destroyed the fishing community's entire fishing fleet of 100 boats, which was the town's entire livelihood. The town's main employment center, a broom and brush plant, was severely damaged, and would close two years after the hurricane. The hurricane also produced severe damage in Pinellas and Hillsborough Counties in the Tampa area. Throughout Florida, damages totaled $3.3 million (1950 USD), a lower than expected total due to the sparse population in the area of the worst damage. After the storm's passage throughout central and northern Florida, "blisters" developed on hundreds of cars; the locations affected reported that the blisters formed on the surface of vehicles shortly after Easy retreated. The following day, the blisters disappeared. Researchers later created several theories as to the unusual occurrence, though they concluded that air pockets under the layer of paint expanded as a result of the decreased barometric pressure.

Heavy rainfall from Hurricane Easy continued into Georgia and occurred throughout the state. The precipitation was most intense and destructive along Georgia's coast, damaging crops and vegetation after waterlogging fields. In some areas, 5–9 in (125–225 mm) of rain was recorded in a single day.

See also 

 Other storms of the same name: Hurricane Easy (disambiguation)
 List of wettest tropical cyclones in the United States
 List of Florida hurricanes (1950–1974)

References 

 Barnes, Jay (2007). Florida's Hurricane History Chapel Hill Press. .

External links 
 Hurricane Easy Rainfall Page from HPC

1950 Atlantic hurricane season
Hurricanes in Florida
Category 3 Atlantic hurricanes
1950 natural disasters in the United States
Hurricanes in Tennessee
Hurricanes in Arkansas